Mount Ellsworth is the highest peak in the Queen Maud Mountains, on the elongated massif between the Steagall and Amundsen Glaciers.

Discovered by Rear Admiral Byrd on the South Pole flight of November 28–29, 1929, and named by him for Lincoln Ellsworth, American Antarctic explorer.

References

Mountains of the Ross Dependency
Amundsen Coast